

History 

Wayne County Schools Career Center is a public vocational school located in Smithville, Ohio.  The school derives its name from the fact that it primarily serves students from the public school districts and private schools located in Wayne County, Ohio.

Associate schools 
source

 Central Christian High School
 Chippewa High School
 Dalton High School
 Heritage Private School
 Kingsway Christian School
 Northwestern High School
 Norwayne High School
 Orrville High School
 Rittman High School
 Smithville High School
 Triway High School
 Waynedale High School
 Wooster High School

History 

Wayne County Schools Career Center began in 1969 as the Wayne County Joint Vocational School, offering 22 programs and three academic classes to 490 students.  Smithville was chosen as the school's location since it was centrally located for all of the participating districts.  Adult Education in the county that had begun in 1967 moved into the building the same time the JVS was opened.  The name was changed to WCSCC in 1984 after more programs were offered.

WCSCC currently offers 26 programs and 18 academic classes to about 750 high school students and over 3,000 Adult Education students.

Notes

Vocational schools in Ohio